This article deals with verses from the Quran that are said to have been revealed about Ali ibn Abi Talib. In a hadith attributed to Ibn Abbas, he knows more than 300 verses of the Quran about Ali.

The majority of Islamic commentators believe that Ali ibn Abi Talib name isn't mentioned in the Quran. A notable exception is Ja'far Ibn al-Haytham who, in his Kitab al-Munazarat, points out that there are explicit uses of the words ʿAliyyan, ʿAliyyun, and ʿAlayya in the Quran which he believes are explicit references to Ali by name, modified according to Arabic grammatical rules.

Chapters and verses

Verse 2:207 

Laylat al-Mabit is the night when the Islamic prophet Muhammad left the city of Mecca and began his migration to Medina. Many of the Meccan polytheists had planned to kill Muhammad on the night that he left Mecca. That night, Ali risked his life by sleeping in Muhammad's bed so that Muhammad could leave Mecca safely. When the polytheists of Mecca went to Muhammad's room with the aim of killing him, they instead found Ali in his bed.

The 207th verse of Surat al-Baqarah in the Quran is interpreted as having been revealed in this regard to show the sacrifice of Imam 'Ali for saving the life of the Islamic Prophet:

Verse 3:61 

In the year 10 AH (631/32 CE), a Christian envoy from Najran (now in southwestern Saudi Arabia) came to Muhammad to debate doctrines regarding ʿĪsā (Jesus). After Muhammad linked Jesus' miraculous birth to the creation of Ādam (Adam),—who was born to neither a mother nor a father — and when the Christians did not accept the Islamic doctrine about Jesus, Muhammad was instructed to call them to Mubahalah where each party should ask God to destroy the false party and their families.

Many historians, both Shi'ite and Sunni, state that the people that Muhammad brought to the Mubahalah were Ali, Fatimah, Hasan, and Husain. Accordingly, in the verse of Mubahalah, it has been stated the phrase "our sons" refers to Hasan and Husayn, "our women" refers to Fatimah, and that "ourselves" refers Muhammad and Ali.

Chapter 5

Verse 5:3 

In the Shi'ite version of the Farewell Sermon, immediately after Muhammad had finished his sermon at Ghadir Khumm, the following verse of the Quran was revealed:

This day have those who reject faith given up all hope of your religion: yet fear them not but fear Me. This day have I perfected your religion for you, completed My favour upon you, and have chosen for you Islam as your religion (5:3).

Verse 5:55 

Shi'ite scholars, along with Sunni ones such as Tabari, Al-Suyuti and Razi, recorded that one day, when Ali was performing the ritual prayers in the Mosque, a beggar began to ask for alms. Ali extended his finger, and the beggar removed his ring. Then Muhammad observed this, and a passage of the Qur'an was sent down upon him (5:55), According to Shi'ites, in this verse, "obedience is absolute and conjoined with obedience to God and his messenger", so the person identified as Wali must be infallible.

Abu Dhar al-Ghifari, one of the earliest converts to Islam, was said to have related the following ḥadith to Ahmad ibn Muhammad al-Tha'labi, the Sunni author of the Tafsir al-Thalabi:
One day, I was praying with the Prophet in the mosque when a beggar walked in. No one responded to his pleas. The beggar raised his hands towards the heavens and said, "Allah! Be a witness that I came to the Prophet's Mosque and no one gave me anything." Imam Ali (a) was bowing during his prayer at that time. He pointed his little finger, on which was a ring, towards the beggar who came forward and took away the ring. The incident occurred in the Prophet's presence, and he raised his face towards heaven and prayed:"O Lord! my brother Musa had begged of Thee to open his breast and to make his work easy for him, to loosen the knot of his tongue so that people might understand him, and to appoint from among his relations his brother, as his wali, and to strengthen his back with Harun and to make Harun his partner in his work. O Allah! Thou said to Musa, 'We will strengthen thy arm with thy brother. No one will now have access to either of you!' O Allah! I am Muhammad and Thou hast given me distinction. Open my breast for me, make my work easy for me, and from my family appoint my brother Ali as my wali. Strengthen my back with him."

Verse 5:67 

This verse, according to Shia beliefs urge the Prophet of Islam to announce Ali as his successor on his way from his last pilgrimage to Mecca.

Verse 33:33 

Shi'ite commentators, along with some Sunni ones, record that the people of the house in this verse are the Ahl al-Kisāʾ (People of the Mantle): Muhammad, Ali, Fatimah, Hasan and Husayn.
According to Wilferd Madelung, "the great majority of the reports quoted by al-Tabari in his commentary on this verse support this interpretation." However, Ibn Kathir, in his tafsir of the verse, says "the [Sunni] scholars are unanimously agreed that they (Muhammad's wives) were the reason for revelation in this case ... but others may be included by way of generalization."

Verse 42:23 

Shi'ite commentators and Sunni ones like Baydawi and Razi agree that the near relatives in question are Ali, Fatimah, Hasan and Husayn. Such a view is rejected by Ibn Kathir, who claims the verse refers to the Quraysh, quoting hadiths from Sahih Bukhari and Ahmad ibn Hanbal. According to Madelung Shi'ite and Sunni sources agree that by the near relatives in this verse and other similar verses were meant the descendants of Muhammad's great-grandfather Hashim ibn ʿAbd Manaf, and of Hashim's brother Al-Muṭṭalib.

See also 

 Muhammad in the Quran
 Sahaba in the Quran
 Sunni view of Ali
 Shia view of Ali
 Imamate and guardianship of Ali ibn Abi Talib

Notes

References

Sources 
 
 
 .
 

Quran
People of the Quran
Ali